Jared Yates Sexton (born October 7, 1981) is an American author and political commentator from Linton, Indiana. He was an associate professor in the Department of Writing and Linguistics at Georgia Southern University.

Early life 
Sexton grew up in southern Indiana.  He studied English and Creative Writing at Indiana State University, and later received his MFA in Creative Writing from Southern Illinois University in 2008.

Career 

Sexton previously taught Creative Writing at Ball State before accepting a position at Georgia Southern University, where he was a tenured Associate Professor of Creative Writing.

Sexton is the author of three short story collections: An End to All Things (Atticus Books), The Hook and the Haymaker (Split Lip Press), and I Am the Oil of the Engine of the World (Split Lip Press), as well as a crime novel,  Bring me the Head of Yorkie Goodman (New Pulp Press), written under the pseudonym Rowdy Yates.

His work has been published in Time Magazine,The New York Times, The New Republic, Salon, Paste, Southern Humanities Review, PANK, and in Hobart.

Political journalism 
In April 2015, Sexton started covering the 2016 U.S. presidential election, attending multiple rallies for both major candidates and writing regular articles for Atticus Review in his column Atticus on the Trail. He covered the Charleston shooting and trail of church burnings in the South. He has written for Time Magazine,New York Times, Salon and the New Republic.

In the summer of 2016, Sexton went to another Trump rally in South Carolina, and reported on the behavior he observed there. His live tweets of the event soon went viral and garnered him national attention, which included frequent death threats. He later wrote about the experience and became a regular contributor to The New Republic and The New York Times.

In December 2016, Sexton was a guest political commentator on The Last Word with Lawrence O'Donnell on MSNBC, as well as on various radio programs, including KCRW.

Selected works

Books 
 An End to All Things: Stories Atticus Books (December 21, 2012) 
 Bring Me the Head of Yorkie Goodman (as Rowdy Yates) New Pulp Press (February 19, 2015) 
 The Hook and the Haymaker Split Lip Press (January 5, 2015) 
 I Am the Oil of the Engine of the World Split Lip Press (February 23, 2016) 
 The People Are Going to Rise Like the Waters on Your Shore: A Story of American Rage (September 12, 2017)  .
 The Man They Wanted Me to Be: Toxic Masculinity and a Crisis of Our Own Making (May 7, 2019) 
American Rule: How A Nation Conquered The World But Failed Its People Dutton/Penguin-Random House (September 15, 2020)
The Midnight Kingdom: A History of Power, Paranoia, and the Coming Crisis, Penguin-Random House (Jan 17, 2023)

Articles 
 "American Horror Story," The New Republic, June 2016.
 "Is the Trump Campaign Just a Giant Safe Space for the Right?", The New York Times, July 2016.
 "Donald Trump's Toxic Masculinity," The New York Times, October 2016.
 "Hillbilly sellout: the politics of J.D. Vance's Hillbilly Elegy are already being used to gut the working poor," Salon, March 2016.

References

External links

1981 births
Living people
21st-century American non-fiction writers
American male non-fiction writers
American political activists
American political writers
Georgia Southern University faculty
Indiana State University alumni
People from Linton, Indiana
Southern Illinois University Carbondale alumni
Writers from Indiana
21st-century American male writers